This Is Me... Justified and Stripped is a live album by Butch Walker, released August 24, 2004 on Epic Records. The title is a parody of album titles by Jennifer Lopez, Justin Timberlake, and Christina Aguilera, even mimicking the fonts used on these album covers.  The CD was only available for a short time period through pre-order of Walker's album Letters from Sony's online store. It contains ten songs off a sixteen song set, recorded live at a concert on June 7, 2003 at the Variety Playhouse in Atlanta, Georgia, as well as an enhanced CD portion with the music videos to "Maybe It's Just Me" and "Joan". The full concert was released two years later on the Live at Budokan DVD.

Track listing
All songs written by Butch Walker.
"Sober" – 4:11
"Diary of a San Fernando Sexx Star" – 4:35
"Mixtape" – 4:59
"Don't Move" – 3:24
"Best Thing You Never Had" – 4:32
"Cigarette Lighter Love Song" – 5:55
"Suburbia" – 5:36
"Every Monday" – 4:03
"Let Me Go" – 2:50
"Take Tomorrow (One Day at a Time)" – 6:36

Butch Walker albums
Albums produced by Butch Walker
2004 live albums
Epic Records live albums